Band-e Amir Rural District is a rural district (dehestan) in Zarqan County, Fars Province, Iran. At the 2006 census, its population was 9,085, in 2,205 families.  The rural district has 26 villages.

References 

Rural Districts of Fars Province
Shiraz County